Hana Mandlíková defeated Wendy Turnbull in the final, 6–0, 7–5 to win the women's singles tennis title at the 1980 Australian Open. The women’s tournament was held from November 24th - 30th, 1980 – separately from the men’s event, which began in late December and concluded the first week of 1981.

Barbara Jordan was the reigning champion, but did not compete this year.

As of 2022, this was the last time at the Australian Open where neither finalist had previously won a major; the 1998 Wimbledon Championships would be the next occurrence of such a final, a span of 63 tournaments. Turnbull was the last Australian to reach the final until Ashleigh Barty in 2022.

Seeds
The seeded players are listed below. Hana Mandlíková is the champion; others show the round in which they were eliminated.

 Martina Navratilova (semifinals)
 Evonne Goolagong (second round)
 Hana Mandlíková (champion)
 Wendy Turnbull (finalist)
 Greer Stevens (quarterfinals)
 Virginia Ruzici (quarterfinals)
 Pam Shriver (quarterfinals)
 Sylvia Hanika (third round)

Qualifying

Draw

Key
 Q = Qualifier
 WC = Wild card
 LL = Lucky loser
 r = Retired

Finals

Earlier rounds

Section 1

Section 2

Section 3

Section 4

External links
 1980 Australian Open – Women's draws and results at the International Tennis Federation

Women's singles
Australian Open (tennis) by year – Women's singles
1980 in Australian women's sport
1981 in Australian women's sport
1980 WTA Tour